The Flying Handicap was an American Thoroughbred horse race run from 1893 through 1909 at Sheepshead Bay Race Track in Sheepshead Bay, Brooklyn, New York. A race for three-year-old horses of either sex, it was last run on dirt over a distance of  furlongs.

Historical notes
Future Hall of Fame horses who won the Flying Handicap include Domino in 1894 and Broomstick in 1904.

Hall of Fame inductee George M. Odom won this race both as a jockey (1903) and as a trainer/owner (1909).

The 1911–1912 statewide shutdown of horse racing
On June 11, 1908, the Republican controlled New York Legislature under Governor Charles Evans Hughes passed the Hart–Agnew anti-betting legislation with penalties allowing for fines and up to a year in prison.

In spite of strong opposition by prominent owners such as August Belmont, Jr. and Harry Payne Whitney, reform legislators were not happy when they learned that betting was still going on at racetracks between individuals and they had further restrictive legislation passed by the New York Legislature in 1910  that made it possible for racetrack owners and members of its board of directors to be fined and imprisoned if anyone was found betting, even privately, anywhere on their premises. After a 1911 amendment to the law to limit the liability of owners and directors was defeated, every racetrack in New York State shut down. As a result, the Flying Handicap was not run in 1911 and 1912.

Owners, whose horses of racing age had nowhere to go, began sending them, their trainers and their jockeys to race in England and France. Many horses ended their racing careers there and a number remained to become an important part of the European horse breeding industry. Thoroughbred Times reported that  more than 1,500 American horses were sent overseas between 1908 and 1913 and of them at least 24 were either past, present, or future Champions. When a February 21, 1913 ruling by the New York Supreme Court, Appellate Division Court saw horse racing return in 1913 it was too late for the Sheepshead Bay horse racing facility and it never reopened.

Records
Speed record:
 1:18.40 @ 6.5 furlongs – Spooner (1908)
 1:12.80 @ 6 furlongs – Dublin (1901)
 1:10.00 @ 5 ¾ furlongs – Domino (1894)

Most wins by a jockey:
 2 – Fred Taral (1894, 1895)

Most wins by a trainer:
 3 – Sam Hildreth (1895, 1899, 1900)

Most wins by an owner:
 2 – Newcastle Stable (1903, 1906)

Winners

References

Open sprint category horse races
Discontinued horse races in New York City
Sheepshead Bay Race Track
Recurring sporting events established in 1893
Recurring sporting events disestablished in 1909
1893 establishments in New York (state)
1909 disestablishments in New York (state)